The Wilbur and Maxine Clauss Ice Arena was an indoor ice hockey venue on the campus of the University of Findlay in Findlay, Ohio.  It was built in 1999 as part of the Ralph and Gladys Koehler Fitness and Recreation Complex to house the Findlay Oilers varsity ice hockey teams.  In 2010, it was converted into a general student recreation center.

References
  

Defunct ice hockey venues in Ohio
Defunct college ice hockey venues in the United States
University of Findlay
Buildings and structures in Hancock County, Ohio
1999 establishments in Ohio
Sports venues completed in 1999
2010 disestablishments in Ohio
Defunct indoor arenas in Ohio